Machhindra FC (formally known as Machhindra Bahal Club) is a Nepali professional football club from the central Kathmandu, neighborhood of Keltole, playing in the Martyr's Memorial A-Division League.

History
Machhindra FC was established in 1973. For sponsorship reasons, it was named Machhindra Bahal Club in 2004, and Machhindra Energizer FC in 2006. The club was promoted to Nepal's top football division in 2004. The team was one of the first teams in Nepal to appoint a foreign coach, Johan Kalin, in 2013, claiming that he was the highest qualified coach in Nepalese football history. He led the team to finish second in the league, for which he was praised for his tactics.

The beginning of the 2020s started the clubs most successful time with two consecutive league championships.

On 5 April, Machhindra appeared in the 2022 AFC Cup qualifying play-off match against Blue Star of Sri Lanka, at the Dasharath Rangasala Stadium but bowed out of the tournament losing 2–1.

Current squad

Current technical staff

Record by season

Honours

National 

 Martyr's Memorial A-Division League
 Champions (2): 2019–20, 2021–22

KP Oli Cup
Champions (1): 2023

References

External links 
Official Facebook page
Official Twitter page
Goal Nepal page

 
Association football clubs established in 1973
Football clubs in Nepal
1973 establishments in Nepal